Fedderly is a surname.  Notable people with the surname include:

 Bernie Fedderly, Canadian drag racing crew chief
 David Fedderly (born 1953), American orchestral tuba player and teacher
 Greg Fedderly, American opera singer

See also
 Federle
 Federley